The Vedra Valles are a set of channels in an ancient river valley in the Lunae Palus quadrangle of Mars, located at 19.4° N and 55.6°  W.  They are 115 km long and were named after an ancient river in Great Britain.

Together with other ancient river valleys, they have provided strong evidence for a great deal of running water on the surface of Mars.

See also

 Geology of Mars
 HiRISE
 Lunae Palus quadrangle
 Outflow channels

References

Further reading

Lunae Palus quadrangle
Valleys and canyons on Mars